In bioinformatics, MAFFT (for multiple alignment using fast Fourier transform) is a program used to create multiple sequence alignments of amino acid or nucleotide sequences. Published in 2002, the first version of MAFFT used an algorithm based on progressive alignment, in which the sequences were clustered with the help of the Fast Fourier Transform. Subsequent versions of MAFFT have added other algorithms and modes of operation, including options for faster alignment of large numbers of sequences, higher accuracy alignments, alignment of non-coding RNA sequences, and the addition of new sequences to existing alignments.

See also 
 Sequence alignment software
 Clustal

References

External links 
 
 MAFFT Online Server
 MAFFT server at EBI
 ClustalW / MAFFT / PRRN at GenomeNet
 ClustalW / TCoffee / MAFFT in MyHits, SIB

Phylogenetics software